Jorge Meireles (born 4 April 2004) is a Portuguese professional footballer who plays for FC Porto B.

Club career 
Jorge Meireles signed his first contract with FC Porto in June 2020—after a season long spell with Padroense FC where he scored 8 goals in 22 games—tying him to the club until 2023.

He made his professional debut for FC Porto B on the 28 November 2021, replacing Mor Ndiaye as his side were down by 3 goals against Feirense, in a Liga Portugal 2 game that eventually ended in a 3–2 away loss.

While making his first steps with FC Porto reserve, Meireles was a regular starter with Porto under-19s in the national competition and the UEFA Youth League, as his side that was top of a pool that included AC Milan, Liverpool and Atlético Madrid until the last round, when the Portuguese side eventually missed the knockout phase.

International career 
Jorge Meireles is a youth international for Portugal, playing with the under-16 in 2020.

Not able to play with the under-17 in a period with most youth international encounters suspended because of covid, Meireles took part in the Tournoi de Limoges in September 2021, notably scoring a goal as Portugal defeated the French hosts 4–2, while Spain eventually won the tournament. Later that year, he was promoted to the Portugal national under-19 team.

Career statistics

References

External links

2004 births
Living people
Portuguese footballers
Portugal youth international footballers
Association football forwards
People from Paços de Ferreira
FC Porto B players
Liga Portugal 2 players
Sportspeople from Porto District